"Shazam!" is a song by Australian alternative rock band Spiderbait that was released on 28 February 1999 as the lead single from the band's fourth studio album, Grand Slam. "Shazam!" peaked at number 44 on the Australian ARIA Singles Chart and was ranked at number 40 on Triple J's Hottest 100 of 1999.

Track listing

Charts

References

 
1998 songs
1999 singles
Polydor Records singles
Song recordings produced by Phil McKellar
Spiderbait songs